Lucky Nosakhare Igbinedion (born 13 May 1957) was the governor of Edo State in Nigeria from 29 May 1999 to 29 May 2007. He is a member of the People's Democratic Party (PDP).

Early life and education
Lucky is a son of Gabriel Igbinedion, Esama of the Kingdom of Benin. He holds a BSc in marketing (1982) from the University of Wyoming in Laramie, and an MBA (1983) from Jackson State University, Mississippi, in the United States.

Career
Chief Igbinedion was appointed Mayor of Oredo Municipality (a local government area in Nigeria) in 1987 and held the position until 1989. In 1989, he was voted the Best Mayor in Nigeria and received an Award for his developmental efforts.

Lucky Nosakhare Igbinedion was elected governor of Edo State in April 1999 Edo State gubernatorial election under PDP and was reelected in 2003. He and his deputy, Mike Oghiadomhe, held office from 29 May 1999 to 29 May 2007.

During the period of his governorship, he established the Edo State Polytechnic Usen and was elected by his colleagues as Chairman of the Nigerian Governors' Forum (NGF).

His wife, Eki Igbinedion, was active against the widespread sex trafficking of women from Edo State to Europe. Eki Igbinedion founded the Idia Renaissance, a non governmental organization to combat trafficking in persons.

After leaving office
In January 2008 he was declared wanted by the Economic and Financial Crimes Commission on 142 counts of financial fraud. This concerns allegations that he embezzled 24 million (£12m) using front companies. He handed himself over later that month. The Benin Youth Council asked for an apology for statements implying he ran away from justice. 

In November 2021, he was also invited by the  Economic and Financial Crimes Commission over alleged criminal diversion of public fund to the tune of 1.6bn.

External links
 Official website

See also
List of Governors of Edo State

References

1957 births
Living people
Edo people
Governors of Edo State
Igbinedion family
Jackson State University alumni
Peoples Democratic Party state governors of Nigeria
University of Wyoming alumni